The Bern-Lötschberg-Simplon-Bahn (BLS), known between 1997 and 2006 as the BLS Lötschbergbahn, was a Swiss railway company. In 2006 the company merged with Regionalverkehr Mittelland AG to form a new company called BLS AG.

BLS owned the largest standard gauge network on the Swiss Railway system apart from the Swiss Federal Railways. The railway had not been built at the time that the Federal government took control of the five big Swiss standard gauge railway companies in 1902 and so it led a separate existence, being considered the largest of the Swiss "private" railways, although the majority of its capital was owned by the cantonal government of Bern, with the Confederation holding about one fifth.

History

Origins 

With the opening of the Gotthard line in 1882 the canton of Bern became separated from the main north–south route. The administration, not being happy with the situation, made full use of its federal rights to build its own line but it could not rely on financial aid from the Swiss Confederation, the authorities being vehemently opposed to any rival transit route. Bern had to look elsewhere to raise the necessary funds and these were to come from an unexpected source. In 1871, due to the Franco-Prussian War, France had surrendered Alsace-Lorraine to Germany. As part of this annexation, the French-Swiss border crossing at Basel was lost.

Because of this, business circles in Paris were interested in co-financing a viable international transit route through Switzerland. Several alternative routes via Frutigen–Lötschberg were proposed but eventually, the Pro-Lötschberg Initiative Committee won the day. The Bern-Lötschberg-Simplon-Bahn was founded on 27 July 1906 and within a few months construction work commenced.

The Lötschberg tunnel 

Possibly because of French finance the construction of the "Mountain Route" the 58 km Frutigen–Brig line, was assigned to a French construction consortium, the major civil engineering work on the section being  single-track Lötschberg Tunnel. Construction began on 15 October 1906 but within months the Swiss federal authorities ordered the BLS to enlarge the tunnel to double track and to profile its access ramps to suit. Money was not forthcoming for the provision of a double track line throughout and only the Lötschberg Tunnel itself was constructed in this way. Due to an accident on 24 July 1908 in which rock, washed with alpine waters, collapsed into the tunnel gallery killing 25 Italian miners, construction work was halted for six months before the gallery was sealed and plans made to bypass the site. The breakthrough was finally made on 31 March 1911.
With the completion of the access ramps, the other civil engineering works on the line, 33 tunnels, 3 avalanche galleries and 22 bridges, together with the provision of electrical support masts, power stations, sub-stations, etc., the line, powered at 15,000 volts, alternating current, 16⅔ Hz was officially opened on 19 June 1913.

Take overs and wartime changes 
The BLS/TSB merger meant that the Lötschbergbahn also became the proprietor of the shipping company on Lake Thun and Lake Brienz.

In 1915, to shorten the distance through the Jura Mountains, to the French border, the company inaugurated the Grenchenberg line between Moutier and Lengnau, which included the  Grenchenberg tunnel.

Following World War I, in 1919, Alsace-Lorraine was returned to France under the Treaty of Versailles, and Basel was restored as a border crossing between France and Switzerland. As a consequence, the importance of Delle as a border crossing point into France became less. Transit traffic was more and more routed via Basle/St Louis. Freight traffic between Germany and Italy, which could be routed via the Lötschberg line meant that the company was able to offset the loss of transit via Delle.

Double-track and piggyback 
Problems with the operation of a single line railway were being seriously felt in the 1960s, but it was not until 1976 that the Federal Council gave their approval to loan of CHF 620,000,000 to upgrade the line to double track, the work to be carried in several stages, commencing the following year. The line, entirely double-track, was officially inaugurated on 8 May 1992.

The construction work began in January 1994 and the opening was delayed, due to geological problems on the southern side of the Simplon, until 11 June 2001. Since opening, the "rolling highway", the transportation of trucks by rail from Germany to Italy via Lötschberg, has made a considerable contribution towards transferring transit traffic from road to rail.

In 1994 the BLS moved 9.2 million passengers.

Politics and railways 
The economic, political and legal operating environment for European railways changed to such an extent towards the end of the 20th century that restructuring amongst railway operators became inevitable. Liberalisation and competition also started to make an impact on railways. (Using EU legislation Britain's railway network can probably show best and worst what happened with its divisions and fragmentation). Although not bound by EU directives Switzerland is surrounded by EU countries and as details arrived from Brussels notice was taken of happenings elsewhere. The BLS Lötschbergbahn reacted early and realigned itself strategically. On 1 January 1997, the jointly-operated BN, GBS and SEZ railways merged with BLS to form BLS Lötschbergbahn AG. The organisation was also changed, the company being now based around the three profit-focused core business of infrastructure, passenger traffic and cargo.

On 15 May 2001, in order to secure their future, the BLS and SBB agreed on a new task-sharing arrangement. This was largely implemented as part of the timetable changes made on 12 December 2004 when the BLS took over the running of the SBB's S-Bahn lines and with it, system responsibility for Bern's S-Bahn network, the second largest in the country. This was accompanied by the transfer of long-distance railway operations from the BLS to the SBB. Within the cargo sector the SBB assumed overall control for full-load traffic in Switzerland. Transit and block train traffic has been subject to competition since the signing of the 2001 agreement. The SBB became responsible for rail network management across Switzerland.

On 27 September 1992, the Swiss people voted with an overwhelming majority in favour of the NRLA project. In voting "Yes" the Swiss people gave their approval for the construction of two transverse routes through the Alps, one at the Gotthard, the other at the Lötschberg.
The new base line was inaugurated on 15 June 2007 and full standard traffic started with the new timetable on 9 December 2007. Since the completion of NRLA and the opening of the new Lötschberg Base Tunnel, the BLS is responsible for the operation of train services along the entire Lötschberg–Simplon route.

Creation of BLS AG 

In June 2006, following their respective Annual General Meetings and with the approval of the shareholders, the Regionalverkehr Mittelland AG and the BLS Lötschbergbahn AG were merged to form BLS AG. The new undertaking belongs to the canton of Bern (55.8%), the Swiss Confederation (21.7%), and further cantons and private persons (22.5%). The BLS AG was actually founded on 24 April 2006, when the cantons of Berne, Lucerne, Solothurn, Valais, and Neuchâtel exchanged their BLS and RM shares for BLS AG ones.

As a result of the fusion of the companies, the BLS AG became the second-biggest operation on Swiss standard-gauge railways after the Swiss Federal Railways. The BLS AG operates regional traffic in an area that lies between Lake Neuchâtel and Lake Lucerne and the Jura Mountains and the Simplon Massif. It is also responsible for operating most routes of the Bern S-Bahn, together with some of those of the Lucerne S-Bahn.

Route 

The directly owned main line of the Bern-Lötschberg-Simplon-Bahn ran from Thun, where it connected with the Swiss Federal Railways through Spiez and the Lötschberg Tunnel to Brig, where it connects with the Swiss Federal Railways owned Simplon Tunnel to Italy. The route between Thun and Spiez formed part of Lake Thun line, which also serves a terminus at Interlaken, whilst from Spiez to Brig the Lötschberg line was used.

This classic main line formed part of a longer route, from the border with France and Germany through the Simplon Tunnel to the border with Italy and Milan. As part of one variant of this route, the BLS also owned and built the Grenchenberg line between Moutier and Lengnau, which included the  Grenchenberg tunnel, and shortened the distance between the French border at Delle and Bern. However most of this longer route was always operated by other railway companies.

Besides the lines mentioned above, the BLS also operated several other independently owned operating companies in the canton of Bern, including the Bern–Neuchâtel railway (BN), the Gürbetal–Bern–Schwarzenburg railway (GBS) and the Spiez–Erlenbach-Zweisimmen railway (SEZ). In 1997, the ownership of these lines was taken over by the BLS.

Between 2004 and 2006, when it was subsumed into the BLS AG, the company also operated extensive commuter services as part of the Bern S-Bahn network. The whole network was electrified at 15 kV 16⅔ Hz.

Locomotives and multiple units 
The Bern-Lötschberg-Simplon-Bahn operated the following locomotives and multiple units.

Class Re 4/4 (Re 425) 

Re 425 170–190 are fitted with ETCS and thus able to pull trains over NBS Mattstetten – Rothrist and through Lötschberg Base Tunnel. Other Re 425 could act in MU as second or third engine and, if required, also behind an Re 465.

Re 425 191–195 were fitted with Railvox public address system and thus primarily used for 
push-pull services. There are 6 driving trailers for passenger services. By December 2010 the use of such consists for additional trains of S-Bahn Bern ended. Five consists are in use around Spiez (2011).

Third field of use are the car shuttles through (old) Lötschberg Tunnel. A total of 9 driving trailers is available for this purpose.

Class Re4/4 II (Re 420)

Other classes

Abbreviations 
 BBC  = Brown, Boveri & Cie
 MFO  = Maschinenfabrik Oerlikon
 SAAS = Société Anonyme des Ateliers de Sécheron, Geneva
 SLM  = Swiss Locomotive and Machine Works, Winterthur

Business activities 
The BLS was engaged in the following activities:
 Maintenance of the infrastructure used by the BLS,
 Passenger rail transportation
 Since a 1994 agreement with the SBB, the BLS has operated many suburban services in Bern, and runs regional services towards Neuchâtel, Luzern and Brig using SBB lines
 BLS was part of the consortium Cisalpino, together with SBB-CFF-FFS and Trenitalia. Later BLS left Cislapino, and in December 2009 Cisalpino ceased operations
 Rail freight transportation via the BLS Cargo subsidiary (in 2002 870 million ton-kilometres of freight were conveyed)
 Rail transportation of accompanied cars through the Lötschberg tunnel
 Rail transportation of trucks between Switzerland and Italy via RAlpin SA (a BLS subsidiary), the SBB, and Hupac (a Swiss road-rail transporter company)
 Lake transport ferries on Lakes Thun and Brienz.

See also
 Rail transport in Switzerland
 Table of turn tunnels

References
 Florian Inäbnit, Jürg Aeschlimann: Bern–Neuenburg-Bahn. Die Linie Bern–Neuenburg der BLS. Prellbock Druck & Verlag, Leissigen 2001. 
 Ulf Degener: Neue Wege im Alpentransit. Umorientierung bei der BLS Lötschbergbahn. In: Lok Magazin. GeraNova, München 41/2002,255, S. 25–26.  
 W. Brügger: Das Frutigbuch. Heimatkunde für die Landschaft Frutigen. Kapitel "Die Bahnen". Paul Haupt, Bern 1977, pp. 419–437.

External links 

 BLS AG

Defunct railway companies of Switzerland

fr:Chemin de fer du Lötschberg
it:BLS SA
nl:BLS Lötschbergbahn
ja:BLS AG